Neha Nair  is an Indian playback singer and composer. Her debut was a duet with Job Kurian in the film Ritu, with music composed by Rahul Raj. She is a guest singer in the Malayalam rock band Avial.

Personal life
She currently resides in Trivandrum with her Husband.

Career
She was introduced by composer Rahul Raj  with the song Cindrella, from the film Rithu. Her next break came through the song Premikkumbol from Salt N' Pepper, composed by Bijibal. She received the IMFA award for best female playback singer for the song. Her notable songs include Melle Kollum, Neeyo, Chillane from 22 Female Kottayam;  Thaazhvaram, Nithya Sahaya Nathe from Thira; Mandarakatte, Kanadooram from 5 Sundarikal;  Thithithara, Aarambathu from Second Show etc. 
She has also composed music for a few films like Iyobinte Pusthakam, Driving Licence, Under world etc. with musician Yakzan Gary Pereira.

Discography

As music composer

As playback singer

As lyricist 
 Kaanaa Dooram - 5 Sundarikal

Awards

 2015 - Kerala State Film Award – Special Mention for Iyobinte Pusthakam

References

Malayalam playback singers
Living people
1989 births
Indian women playback singers
Singers from Mumbai
Women musicians from Maharashtra
21st-century Indian women singers
21st-century Indian singers